Cumshewa is a former village of the Haida people located on the north flank of Cumshewa Inlet in the Haida Gwaii of the North Coast of British Columbia, Canada.  It is named for Cumshewa, an important Haida chief during the era of the Maritime Fur Trade (late 17th and early 19th Centuries), as is Cumshewa Head, an important headland and point on the north side of the opening of Cumshewa Inlet, which pierces Moresby Island from the east and was the location of several historical Haida villages.

The name Cumshewa Inlet was coined by captains in the marine fur trade after the most important local chief, Cumshewa.  The name was long in use on marine charts but was made official in the British Columbia gazette on April 6, 1926.  The last few inhabitants of Cumshewa were encouraged to move to Skidegate in 1926.

Name

Cumshewa is a Heiltsuk word meaning "rich at the mouth of the river".  The ancient Haida name for the village was Thlinul anglicized as Tlkinool by John Work during a Hudson's Bay Company census in 1839.

See also
New Clew, British Columbia (Tanu)
List of Haida villages

References

Canadian Museum of Civilization webpage on Cumshewa

Haida villages
Populated places in Haida Gwaii
Unincorporated settlements in British Columbia